The Variophone was developed by Evgeny Sholpo in 1930 at Lenfilm Studio Productions, in Leningrad, the Soviet Union, during his experiments with graphical sound techniques, also known as ornamental, drawn, paper, artificial or synthetic sound. In his research Sholpo was assisted by the composer Georgy Rimsky‐Korsakov.
The Variophone was an optical synthesizer that utilized sound waves cut onto cardboard disks rotating synchronously with a moving 35mm movie film while being photographed onto it to produce a continuous soundtrack. Afterwards this filmstrip is played as a normal movie by means of a film projector. Being read by photocell, amplified and monitored by a loudspeaker, it functions as a musical recording process.

Although with the first version of the Variophone, polyphonic soundtracks of up to 6 voices could be produced by shooting of several monophonic parts and combining them later, by the late 1930s and 1940s, some soundtracks contained up to twelve voices, recorded as tiny parallel tracks inside the normal soundtrack area.

At the same time in the Soviet Union several other artists were experimenting with similar ideas. The first artificial soundtrack ever created was drawn in 1930 by composer and musical theorist Arseny Avraamov who was working with a hand-drawn technique for producing sound effects.  Nikolai Voinov, Ter‐Gevondian and Konstantinov were developing paper sound techniques. Boris Yankovsky was developing his spectral analysis, decomposition and resynthesis technique, resembling the recent computer music techniques of cross synthesis and the phase vocoder.

Many sound films and artificial soundtracks for movies and cartoons were produced by means of the Variophone, including the popular sound-films, often broadcast in 1930-1940s Symphony of the Piece and Torreodor. At the end of 1941 Siege of Leningrad, the Variophon was destroyed when the last missile exploded.  After World War II, Evgeny Sholpo became the director of the new Scientific‐Research Laboratory for Graphical sound at the State Research Institute for Sound Recording, in Leningrad.

The fourth and final version of Variophone was not finished, despite promising experiments in musical intonation and the temporal characteristics of live musical performance. The laboratory was moved to Moscow and Sholpo was removed from his position as director.  In 1951, after a long illness, Evgeny Sholpo died and his laboratory was closed.

Documentation for the Variophones was transferred to the Acoustical Laboratory at Moscow State Conservatory and later, to the Theremin Center.  In 2007, several hours of graphical soundtracks produced with the Variophone were discovered in a Moscow film archive and await publishing.

See also 
 Daphne Oram
 Oramics

References 
 Izvolov Nikolai.From the history of painted sound in USSR. Kinovedcheskie Zapiski, no.53, 2001, p. 292 (in Russian)
 Levin, Thomas. 2003. Tones from out of Nowhere: Rudolf Pfenninger and the Archaeology of Synthetic Sound. Grey Room 12 (Fall 2003): p. 32-79
 Smirnov, Andrei. Sound Out of Paper. Moscow, November, 2007
 Smirnov, Andrei. Boris Yankovsky: Leben im Klangspektrum. Gezeichneter Klang und Klangsynthese in der Sowjetunion der 30er Jahre. pp. 97–120; Tim Boykett/Andrei Smirnov. Notation und visuelle Musik. pp. 121–126. Klangmaschinen zwischen Experiment und Medientechnik. (C)2010 transcript Verlag, Bielefeld. Aus:Daniel Gethmann (Hg.)
 Smirnov, Andrei. Son produit par la lumiere et le papier. Article in the catalogue of the exhibition "Vois ce que j'entends" at the Centre des Arts Enghien-les-Bains, France. pp. 16–27, 
 Andrei Smirnov & Liubov Pchelkina. Les Pionniers Russes de'l ART du SON. Experimentations musicales. Article in the catalogue of the exhibition "LENIN, STALIN and Music", pp. 96–105. Musee de la musique, October 12, 2010 - January 16, 2011. Cite de la musique, Paris.

External links
Variophone at the Theremin Center website (in Russian)
Excerpt form Carburettor Suite by G.Rimsky-Korsakov, created with Variophone in 1935
Excerpt form Prelude by Chopin, created with Variophone in 1935
Excerpt form Rhapsody by List, created with Variophone in 1935
Excerpt form Sterviatniki soundtrack by E.Sholpo and I.Boldirev, created with Variophone in 1941
A link mentioning the invention
 
 
 
Synthesizers
Soviet inventions
Russian electronic musical instruments
Graphical sound